Time to completion (TTC) is a calculated amount of time required for any particular task to be completed. Completion is defined by the span from "conceptualization to fruition (delivery)", and is not iterative.

Similar to the metaphorical use of estimated time of arrival. TTC is commonly used when reporting on unmovable dates within a project time line. For example, a developer may report a TTC of 28 hours in regard to programming a particular application; although the application could perhaps be finished in 20 hours, the full allotted TTC will be fixed at 28 hours.

References

Schedule (project management)